Paradeudorix is a  genus of butterflies in the family Lycaenidae. The species of this genus are found in the Afrotropical realm.

Species
Paradeudorix boormani (Larsen, 1996)
Paradeudorix cobaltina (Stempffer, 1964)
Paradeudorix eleala (Hewitson, 1865)
Paradeudorix ituri (Bethune-Baker, 1908)
Paradeudorix marginata (Stempffer, 1962)
Paradeudorix michelae Libert, 2004
Paradeudorix moyambina (Bethune-Baker, 1904)
Paradeudorix petersi (Stempffer & Bennett, 1956)

External links

Taxonomy and distribution at funet

Theclinae
Lycaenidae genera
Deudorigini